Dalvir Singh Khangura is former MLA from Dhuri, Sangrur District, Punjab. He got elected for the seat in the 2017 Punjab Legislative Assembly election. He is a politician in Indian National Congress. Dalvir Singh Khangura, known as "Goldy", was born on 24 September 1982 in a Jat Sikh family in Dhuri, District Sangrur, Punjab India. He has done his schooling from S.V.M., Dhuri. He later joined S.D. College, Chandigarh and did his Graduation and PGDCA.

Career
He contested as College Representative in S.D. College in 2002 and won. He was chosen as President of Student Union Of Panjab University (SOPU) to represent them in college elections as college president in 2003–2004.

Dalvir then joined Punjab University, Chandigarh. He became the President of Punjab University Campus Student Counsel in the year 2006–2007.

Dalvir Singh than joined Youth congress in 2007, working at various levels for Congress party since then. He is also Chairman, Panchayati Raj Sangathan (District Sangrur).

Member of the Legislative Assembly
He was then fielded as the candidate for 2017 legislative assembly elections from Dhuri, Punjab. Dalvir won the seat of MLA from Dhuri and polled 49,349 votes and won with the margin of 2838 votes from INC party.

Electoral Performance

Personal life
Dalvir Singh is married to Simrat Khangura and has two sons.

References

1982 births
Living people
Punjab, India MLAs 2017–2022
Indian Sikhs
Panjab University alumni
People from Sangrur district